Leo Dennis Kozlowski (born November 16, 1946) is a former CEO of Tyco International, convicted in 2005 of crimes related to his receipt of $81 million in unauthorized bonuses, the purchase of art for $14.725 million and the payment by Tyco of a $20 million investment banking fee to Frank Walsh, a former Tyco director. 

He served more than six years at the Mid-State Correctional Facility in Marcy, New York, before being transferred to the Lincoln Correctional Facility in New York City, from which he was granted conditional release on January 17, 2014. Separately, Tyco filed suit against Kozlowski and prevailed, with the court finding that the $500 million in compensation and benefits he received during his time of disloyalty, between 1997 and 2002, were forfeited back to the company under New York's "faithless servant" doctrine.

Early life
Kozlowski was born in Newark, New Jersey. His mother, Agnes (née Kozell), worked for the Newark Police Department and as a school crossing guard, and his father, Leo Kelly Kozlowski, worked for the Public Service Transport. His parents were second-generation Polish-Americans. Kozlowski attended Seton Hall University, a Catholic university.

Tyco International
Kozlowski joined Tyco in 1975, becoming CEO in 1992.  With Kozlowski at the helm, Tyco massively expanded during the late 1990s.  The company consistently beat Wall Street's expectations and through a series of strategic mergers and acquisitions, ushered in a new era of mega-conglomerates. Kozlowski left Tyco in 2002, amid a controversy in regard to his compensation package.

Scandal, trial, and conviction
Kozlowski was tried twice. The first attempt was a ruled mistrial when one of the jurors was threatened by the public after being reported to have made an OK sign towards Kozlowski's lawyers. Kozlowski testified on his own behalf during the second trial, stating that his pay package was "confusing" and "almost embarrassingly big," but that he never committed a crime as the company's top executive.

Along with former Tyco chief financial officer Mark Swartz, Kozlowski was convicted on June 17, 2005 of crimes related to his receipt of $81 million in purportedly unauthorized bonuses, the purchase of art for $14.725 million and the payment by Tyco of a $20 million investment banking fee to Frank Walsh, a former Tyco director. On September 19, 2005 he was sentenced by Judge Michael Obus of the Manhattan Supreme Court to serve from eight years and four months to twenty-five years in prison for his role in the scandal.  In addition, Kozlowski and Swartz were ordered to pay a total of $134 million in restitution.  Kozlowski was further fined $70 million, while Swartz was fined $35 million.  Both were convicted on 22 counts of grand larceny, falsifying business records, securities fraud and conspiracy.

His aggregate minimum sentence was set at 8 years and 4 months, and his aggregate maximum sentence was 25 years; his conditional release date was set for May 17, 2022, and his maximum expiration date was September 17, 2030. In April 2012, Kozlowski was denied parole. His next parole eligibility date, and his parole hearing merit release appearance, were then set for January 17, 2014. On January 17, 2014, he was granted conditional release from the Lincoln Correctional Facility in New York City.

Commenting on his trial

Kozlowski, prior to trial, asserted his innocence by stating, "I am absolutely not guilty of the charges. There was no criminal intent here. Nothing was hidden. There were no shredded documents. All the information the prosecutors got was directly off the books and records of the company." After his conviction, but before his appeal was complete, he again denied his guilt. "I was a guy sitting in a courtroom making $100 million a year [a]nd I think a juror sitting there just would have to say, 'All that money? He must have done something wrong.' I think it's as simple as that."

Nevertheless, Kozlowski admitted his culpability for the crimes at his parole hearing. “It was greed, pure and simple,” the 67-year-old former executive told a New York State parole panel at a December 3 video conference hearing. “I feel horrible ... I can't say how sorry I am and how deeply I regret my actions.”

Faithless servant liability

Tyco filed against Kozlowski, asserting that the $500 million in compensation and benefits he received during his time of disloyalty, between 1997 and 2002, were forfeit under New York's "faithless servant" doctrine.  Southern District of New York Judge Thomas Griesa concluded in 2010 that under the faithless servant doctrine, Kozlowski must forfeit all compensation and benefits he earned during his period of disloyalty.

Personal life
Kozlowski has been married three times, and has grandchildren.
Kozlowski became notorious for his extravagant lifestyle, supported by the booming stock market of the late 1990s and early 2000s; allegedly, he had Tyco pay for his $30 million New York City apartment which included $6,000 shower curtains and $15,000 "dog umbrella stands".

According to Forbes, Kozlowski also purchased several acres in the private gated community, "The Sanctuary", in Boca Raton, Florida, while he was CEO at Tyco International.  He also purchased a multimillion-dollar oceanfront estate on the island of Nantucket.

Tyco paid $1 million (half of the $2 million bill) for the 40th birthday party of Kozlowski's second wife, Karen Mayo Kozlowski. The extravagant party, held on the Italian island of Sardinia, featured an ice sculpture of Michelangelo's David urinating Stolichnaya vodka and a private concert by Jimmy Buffett. In a camcorder video, Dennis Kozlowski states that this party will bring out a Tyco core competency – the ability to party hard. Subsequently, this shareholder meeting/birthday party became known as the Tyco Roman Orgy.

On July 31, 2006, Karen Kozlowski filed for divorce in Palm Beach County, Florida. No specific reasons were cited, but the motion asked the court to equitably distribute the couple's assets and liabilities and asked that gifts Karen received be declared marital property. She also sought a lien on the couple's Boca Raton mansion. The motion also requested alimony.

Kozlowski served as Head of the Board at Berwick Academy in South Berwick, Maine, for many years, and served on the Middlebury College Board of Trustees in the 1990s.

Dennis Kozlowski now lives between NYC, Florida and Nantucket and runs several businesses with his third wife, Kimberly. Dennis is the Chairman of the Board of the Fortune Society and Kimberly is the President of the Women's Prison Association.

References

Further reading
A Hill and A Michaels, 'Paw taste condemns Kozlowski: Report says Tyco bought $15,000 dog umbrella stand for chief's apartment' (September 18, 2002) Financial Times

External links
 Video: October 2011 Kozlowsi Applying for Release
 Interview with Dennis Kozlowski from prison by writer Peter Hossli
 Dennis Kozlowski's Campaign Contributions
 The Infamous Party Invitation
 Partial transcript of the CBS 60 Minutes interview from cbsnews.com

1946 births
American chief executives
American people convicted of fraud
American people of Polish descent
American prisoners and detainees
Living people
People from Boca Raton, Florida
Businesspeople from Newark, New Jersey
Prisoners and detainees of New York (state)
Seton Hall University alumni
Tyco International
American businesspeople convicted of crimes